Febles is a surname. Notable people with the surname include:

Carlos Febles (born 1976), Dominican professional baseball coach and former professional baseball player
Daniel Febles (born 1991), Venezuelan footballer
Magali Febles (born 1964), Dominican beautician and pageant director
Pedro Febles (1958–2011), Venezuelan footballer and manager

Spanish-language surnames